Mohamed Dräger (born 25 June 1996) is a professional footballer who plays as a right-back and right winger for Swiss Super League club Luzern, on loan from  club Nottingham Forest. Born in Germany, he plays for the Tunisia national team.

Club career
Born to a German father and Tunisian mother, Dräger made his professional debut for SC Freiburg on 27 July 2017, in a UEFA Europa League qualifying match against Slovenian club Domžale, coming on as a substitute in the 87th minute for Mike Frantz.

In 2018, Dräger joined SC Paderborn on a two-year loan. In September 2020, he joined Greek club Olympiacos on a transfer fee in the range of €1 million.

On 31 August 2021, Dräger joined EFL Championship side Nottingham Forest for an undisclosed fee.

On 2 February 2022, Dräger moved on loan to Swiss Super League club Luzern, with an option to buy.

International career
Dräger made his debut for the Tunisia national team on 20 November 2018, in a friendly against Morocco, as a 79th-minute substitute for Naïm Sliti, and scored on 13 October 2020 his first goal in a 1–1 friendly game draw away to Nigeria.

Career statistics

Club

International

International goals

Scores and results list Tunisia's goal tally first, score column indicates score after each Dräger goal.

Honours
Olympiacos
Super League Greece: 2020–21

Tunisia
Africa Cup of Nations fourth place: 2019

References

External links
 
 

1996 births
Living people
German people of Tunisian descent
Tunisian people of European descent
Citizens of Tunisia through descent
German sportspeople of African descent
Sportspeople from Freiburg im Breisgau
Tunisian footballers
German footballers
Association football midfielders
Tunisia international footballers
2019 Africa Cup of Nations players
2021 Africa Cup of Nations players
SC Freiburg II players
SC Freiburg players
SC Paderborn 07 players
Olympiacos F.C. players
Nottingham Forest F.C. players
FC Luzern players
Regionalliga players
Bundesliga players
2. Bundesliga players
Super League Greece players
Expatriate footballers in Greece
Tunisian expatriate sportspeople in Greece
Expatriate footballers in England
Tunisian expatriate sportspeople in England
Expatriate footballers in Switzerland
Tunisian expatriate sportspeople in Switzerland
Footballers from Baden-Württemberg
2022 FIFA World Cup players